Konstadina Efedaki (born October 1, 1978 in Athens) is a Greek middle-distance runner. She is a two-time national champion (2003–2004) for the 1500 metres.

Efedaki represented the host nation Greece at the 2004 Summer Olympics, coincidentally in her home city, where she placed twelfth in the semi-final rounds of the women's 1500 metres, with a time of 4:09.37.

At the 2008 Summer Olympics in Beijing, Efedaki competed for the second time in the 1500 metres. She ran in the first heat against ten other athletes, including Bahrain's Maryam Yusuf Jamal, who was considered a top favorite for this event. She finished the race in tenth place by six seconds behind Kenya's Irene Jelagat, with a slowest possible time of 4:15.02. Efedaki, however, failed to advance into the final, as she placed twenty-fourth overall and was ranked below three mandatory slots for the next round.

References

External links

NBC 2008 Olympics profile

1978 births
Living people
Greek female middle-distance runners
Olympic athletes of Greece
Athletes (track and field) at the 2004 Summer Olympics
Athletes (track and field) at the 2008 Summer Olympics
Athletes from Athens